Sumerpur is a hamlet of the village Chhanchhi Rai Khera, in Purwa tehsil of Unnao district, Uttar Pradesh, India. Located 26km south of Purwa and 50km southeast of Unnao, Sumerpur serves as the headquarters of a community development block as well as a nyaya panchayat. Sumerpur block was first established on 2 October 1955 in order to oversee implementation of India's Five-Year Plans at a local and rural level. As of 2011, the block comprises 148 villages and has a total population of 151,933 people in 28,469 households.

Sumerpur has a library, a primary healthcare centre, an artificial insemination centre, and a veterinary hospital. The main crops are wheat, barley, gram, juwar, bajra, and paddy. Irrigation is provided by a canal and by wells. Sumerpur is located in the historical pargana of Bihar, which is 4km to the northeast and connected to Sumerpur by an unmetalled road.

Sumerpur hosts a market twice per week, on Thursdays and Sundays, with vegetables and cloth being the main items of business. As of 1961, its average attendance was about 300 people.

Villages 
Sumerpur CD block has the following 148 villages:

References

Unnao district
Community development blocks in India